Żuklin  (Zhuklyn) is a village in the administrative district of Gmina Kańczuga, within Przeworsk County, Subcarpathian Voivodeship, in south-eastern Poland.

The village has an approximate population of 450.

Places to see
The palace in which the Kellermans have lived in since the 19th century is under construction and is owned privately.

Politics
Commune leader - Andrzej Seremet

References

Villages in Przeworsk County